The 2015–16 Oral Roberts Golden Eagles men's basketball team represented Oral Roberts University during the 2015–16 NCAA Division I men's basketball season. The Golden Eagles were led by 17th year head coach Scott Sutton and played their home games at the Mabee Center. They were members of The Summit League. They finished the season 14–17, 6–10 in Summit League play to finish in seventh place. They lost in the quarterfinals of The Summit League tournament to South Dakota State.

Roster
Source

Schedule
Source

|-
!colspan=9 style="background:#000080; color:#D4AF37;"| Exhibition

|-
!colspan=9 style="background:#000080; color:#D4AF37;"| Regular season

|-
!colspan=9 style="background:#000080; color:#D4AF37;"| The Summit League tournament

References

Oral Roberts Golden Eagles men's basketball seasons
Oral Roberts
2015 in sports in Oklahoma
2016 in sports in Oklahoma